Brittany MacLean (born March 3, 1994) is a Canadian retired competitive swimmer who has represented her country  in the Summer Olympics and other international championships. She won a bronze medal in the women's 4 x 200 m freestyle relay at the 2016 Summer Olympics.

Career

Brittany MacLean was first selected as a member of Canada's senior national team in 2011, when she swam at the 2011 World Aquatics Championships in Shanghai, China.  She qualified for the 4x200-metre freestyle relay team that finished 7th in the event final.  Also in 2011, MacLean was qualified for the 2011 3rd FINA World Junior Swimming Championships in Lima, Peru, where she claimed 2 golds, a silver and a bronze.  She claimed gold in the 400-metre and the 200-metre freestyle, silver in the 4x100-metre freestyle relay, and bronze in the 4x200-metre freestyle relay. She set and new junior world record in the 200-metre freestyle with a time of 1.58.93. She attended the Silverthorn Collegiate Institute in Toronto.

She then made her way to the special events and marketing team at the Toronto Blue Jays. She led a team of employees to engage with fans and manage events.

2012 Canadian Olympic Trials, Montreal, Quebec

On March 27, 2012, MacLean qualified to her first Olympic team by winning the Women's 400-metre freestyle final with a new Canadian record of 4.06.08. On the third day of the trials, she qualified for the 4x200-metre freestyle relay with her teammate Amanda Reason. Setting a new personal best of 1.58.09. All of this, Brittany wasn't happy with what she made as long as her sister, Heather was joining her on the team. Her sister Heather qualified for the team on her last event the 4x100-metre finishing 3rd with a securing spot to London.

2012 Summer Olympics, London, England

At the 2012 Summer Olympics in London, MacLean swam the 400-metre freestyle heats as her first event, while breaking her Canadian record to 4.05.06 which qualified her to sixth in the final. In the final, she finished 7th with a 4.06.24. In her second event, the 4x200-metre freestyle relay, MacLean swam the anchor leg for the relay heats which qualified Canada to third for the final with her teammates Barbara Jardin, Samantha Cheverton and Amanda Reason with a time of 7.50.84. In the final, MacLean and her teammates finished fourth with a time of 7.50.65.

2016 Summer Olympics
In 2016, she was officially named to Canada's Olympic team for the 2016 Summer Olympics. MacLean helped the Canadian team win a bronze in the  4x200-metre freestyle relay, but had her performance in individual races hindered by illness, which even had her miss the relay qualifiers. In October, she announced her retirement, deciding to instead finish her degree in sport management at the University of Georgia.

Personal Bests

Long course (50 m pool)

Honours
In 2012 MacLean was awarded the Queen Elizabeth II Diamond Jubilee Medal.

See also

 List of Olympic medalists in swimming (women)
 List of Commonwealth Games medallists in swimming (women)
 List of University of Georgia people

References

External links
 

1994 births
Living people
Canadian female freestyle swimmers
Georgia Bulldogs women's swimmers
University of Georgia alumni
Olympic swimmers of Canada
Sportspeople from Etobicoke
Swimmers from Toronto
Swimmers at the 2012 Summer Olympics
Swimmers at the 2014 Commonwealth Games
Swimmers at the 2015 Pan American Games
Commonwealth Games silver medallists for Canada
Pan American Games bronze medalists for Canada
Swimmers at the 2016 Summer Olympics
Olympic bronze medalists for Canada
Medalists at the 2016 Summer Olympics
Olympic bronze medalists in swimming
Commonwealth Games medallists in swimming
Pan American Games medalists in swimming
Universiade medalists in swimming
Universiade bronze medalists for Canada
Medalists at the 2013 Summer Universiade
Medalists at the 2015 Pan American Games
Medallists at the 2014 Commonwealth Games